Preap Sovath (born 25 January 1975) is a Cambodian singer, actor and brand ambassador. He began his singing career in the early 1990s. He also appeared in Cambodian movies such as The Crocodile. He was also an audition judge for the first season of Cambodian Idol, first season of Cambodia's Got Talent, as well as The Voice Kid Cambodia.

Achievements

|-
| 2007
| Cambodia Best Actor
| Top Honor at Cambodian Film
| 
| The Crocodile (IMDb-2005)
| 
|-
| 2012
| Cambodia Top Singer Award
| Anachak Dara
| 
| Sabay Company
| 
|-
| 2013
| Best Male Singer Award
| Anachak Dara
| 
| Sabay Company
| 
|-
| 2014
| Represention of Cambodia
| World Music Awards
| 
| Monte Carlo Monaco 2014
|

Career
Sovath's career as a singer started in the 1990s when he joined the army and became a political commissar. He worked during the daytime and sang at restaurants or bars at nighttime.
He sang with Touch Sunnix for a year, from 1995 to 1996, and released his first song.

He represented Cambodia in the 2014 World Music Awards and was nominated.

Contracting with Rasmey Hang Meas Production since 1994, Sovath joined Galaxy Navatra in 2020 with the hope to promote Khmer Music and artists to the international stage.

Performances
Sovath took part in the MTV EXIT Concert in Phnom Penh on December 12, 2008. The concert was part of a campaign to raise awareness to end exploitation and human trafficking in Asia.

Sovath has performed at the Best of the Best: Live Concert, a concert which has taken place annually since 2004 at Phnom Penh Olympic Stadium and has included performances by Cambodian singers from Raksmey Hang Meas and more. The concert is free to the public; DVD sales cover the costs. He also performed at Best of the Best 2012 on February 14, 2012 at Koh Pich's Concert Hall.

Preap Sovath has also been involved in many international concerts such as:
 Japan Music Festival – 2003
 Thai-Cambodian Friendship Concert 2010
 Japan ASEAN Music Festival for Healing 2013

Discography

Solo albums

Compilation albums

Filmography
 2005: The Crocodile ("នេសាទក្រពើ")
 2013: Have You Ever Loved Me? ("ធ្លាប់ស្រលាញ់ខ្ញុំទេ?")

Television
 2014: Cambodian's Got Talent Season 1 (judge) Hang Meas HDTV
 2015: Cambodian Idol Season 1 (judge) Hang Meas HDTV
 2016: Cambodian Idol Season 2 (judge) Hang Meas HDTV
 2017: The Voice Kids Cambodia Season 1 (coach) Hang Meas HDTV
 2017: Cambodian Idol Season 3 (judge) Hang Meas HDTV
 2018: Cambodian's Got Talent Season 2 (judge) Hang Meas HDTV
 2018: The Voice Kids Cambodia (coach) Hang Meas HDTV
 2018: The Voice Kids Cambodia Season 2 (coach) Hang Meas HDTV
 2019–2020 Cambodian Idol Junior (judge) Hang Meas HDTV

References

1975 births
Living people
21st-century Cambodian male singers
People from Kandal province